Francis Finch (born c. 1585) was an English lawyer and politician who sat in the House of Commons between 1624 and 1629.

Finch was the son of Sir Moyle Finch, 1st Baronet of Eastwell, Kent and his wife Elizabeth Heneage, daughter and heiress of Sir Thomas Heneage. He matriculated at Corpus Christi College, Oxford on 12 June 1601, aged 15. He was called to the bar at Inner Temple in 1614. In 1624, he was elected Member of Parliament for Eye for the Happy Parliament. He was re-elected MP for Eye in 1625, 1626 and 1628 and sat until 1629 when King Charles decided to rule without parliament for eleven years.

References

1580s births
Year of death unknown 
English MPs 1624–1625
English MPs 1625
English MPs 1626
English MPs 1628–1629
Younger sons of baronets
Younger sons of earls